Ellen's Design Challenge is an American furniture design reality competition series that premiered on January 26, 2015, on HGTV. The six-episode first season was announced in April 2014, as the first cable television series executive produced by talk show host Ellen DeGeneres. In June 2015, HGTV renewed the series for a second season, that premiered on January 18, 2016.

Background 
The competition series features six furniture designers competing together by showing their abilities in sketching, designing and building furniture within 24 hours. Contestants must demonstrate their creativity and versatility in order to impress a panel of judges after each task they do. HGTV handymen and television personalities Jeff Devlin, Brooks Utley, Karl Champley, Chip Wade, David Sheinkopf and Matt Muenster are the team of carpenters that help the contestants. Jay Montepare is the host of the show while Dwell editor-in-chief Amanda Dameron and Christiane Lemieux, executive creative director at Wayfair, are the judges. DeGeneres is the executive producer and makes numerous appearances throughout the show.

Six contestants of the first season included Jose Gaspar de Jesus, Katie Stout, Tim McClellan, Carly Eisenberg, Mark Moskovitz and Leslie Shapiro Joyal. Katie Stout was declared the winner, and awarded the top cash prize of $100,000 and an opportunity to be featured in HGTV Magazine Tim McClellan was originally the winner but was disqualified making him the runner up   .

In June 2015, HGTV renewed Ellen's Design Challenge for a second season, which began airing in January 2016. The second season featured additional competitors and had more episodes (nine instead of six), including a 60-minute-long special episode that showed  behind-the-scenes moments. The contestants of the second season included Vivian Beer, Bradley Bowers, Julie Browning Bova, Miles Endo, McKenzie Gibson, Kyle Huntoon, Alexis Moran, Sef Pinney, Melissa Rivera Torres, and Dave Yale.

Episodes

Season 1 (2015)

Season 1 elimination table

 (WINNER) This designer won the competition due to another contestant's disqualification.
 (DISQUALIFIED) This designer finished in second place due to disqualification.
 (WIN) The designer won the elimination challenge and was safe.
 (HIGH) The designer was one of the top entries in the elimination challenge, but did not win.
 (IN) The designer was not selected as a top entry or bottom entry in an elimination challenge.
 (LOW) The designer was part of a non-elimination bottom two.
 (LOW) The designer was one of the bottom entries in an elimination challenge, and was the last person to advance.
 (ELIM) The designer was eliminated from Ellen's Design Challenge.

 No one was eliminated during this episode.
 There was no winner nor bottom two during this elimination challenge.
 Tim was originally announced as the winner during the finale, but was later Disqualified, thus giving Katie the win.

Season 2 elimination table

 (WINNER) This designer won Ellen's Design Challenge.
 (RUNNER UP) This designer finished in second place.
 (WIN) The designer won the elimination challenge and was safe.
 (HIGH) The designer was one of the top entries in the elimination challenge, but did not win.
 (IN) The designer was not selected as a top entry or bottom entry in an elimination challenge.
 (IN) The designer was selected to advance on to the final 8. 
 (LOW) The designer was one of the bottom entries in an elimination challenge, and was the last person to advance.
 (LOW) The designer was part of a non-elimination bottom two.
 (RISK) The designer was at risk of not advancing to the final 8.
 (ELIM) The designer was eliminated from Ellen's Design Challenge.
 (ELIM) The designer did not make the final 8 and was eliminated from Ellen's Design Challenge.

 No one was eliminated during this episode.

Controversy 
The finale of the first season has sparked some controversy. Katie Stout and Tim McClellan were the two remaining contestants and judges decided to declare McClellan as the winner during the final episode which aired on March 2, 2015. However, it turned out that the winning piece of furniture was very similar to an existing design by European craftsman Simon Schacht. McClellan was eventually disqualified and Stout was named the winner during the taping of The Ellen DeGeneres Show. McClellan appeared on Ellen as well shortly after the controversy and addressed the decision by saying that "the similarities of the two pieces are quite compelling," also adding that he agrees to the decision that has been made and "recognize[s] Katie as the legitimate winner of the show." The controversy has since raised some questions whether it was a publicity stunt.

See also

 Designer Superstar Challenge
 HGTV Design Star

References

External links 
 
 
 

Ellen DeGeneres
HGTV original programming
2010s American reality television series
2015 American television series debuts
2016 American television series endings
English-language television shows
Television series by A Very Good Production
Television series by Telepictures